Palace Hotel, also known as Hudson School, Hudson Community Center, Brown's Chapel, Methodist Episcopal Church, and Hudson Methodist Church, is a historic one-room school building located near Appleton City, Bates County, Missouri. It was built in 1891, and originally housed a Methodist church.  It was purchased and reconfigured for use as a school in 1911.  It is a one-story, frame building with a cross-gable roof.  It measures 45 feet, 6 inches, by 38 feet, 6 inches.  It was last used as a schoolhouse in 1952.

It was listed on the National Register of Historic Places in 2002.

References

One-room schoolhouses in Missouri
School buildings on the National Register of Historic Places in Missouri
School buildings completed in 1911
Buildings and structures in Bates County, Missouri
National Register of Historic Places in Bates County, Missouri
1911 establishments in Missouri